The Galloping Major is a 1951 British comedy sports film, starring Basil Radford, Jimmy Hanley and Janette Scott. It also featured Sid James, Charles Hawtrey and Joyce Grenfell in supporting roles. It was directed by Henry Cornelius and made at the Riverside Studios in Hammersmith. The film's sets were designed by Norman Arnold.

The title is taken from the song "The Galloping Major", and the plot was centred on gambling at the horse racing track. People in a London suburb form a syndicate to buy a race horse to run in the Grand National.

Production
The film was made as an independent production, backed by the Woolf Brothers. It proved profitable at the box office, but producer Monja Danischewsky quit independent production afterwards to return to work at Ealing Studios. It has been noted as being similar in style to the Ealing comedies of the same era.

It features appearances by several figures well known at the time, including the jockey Charlie Smirke and the radio commentators Raymond Glendenning and Bruce Belfrage.

Main cast
 Basil Radford as Major Arthur Hill
 Jimmy Hanley as Bill Collins
 Janette Scott as Susan Hill
 A. E. Matthews as Sir Robert Medleigh
 Rene Ray as Pam Riley
 Hugh Griffith as Harold Temple
 Joyce Grenfell as Maggie
 Charles Victor as Sam Fisher
 Sydney Tafler as Mr. Leon
 Charles Lamb as Ernie Smart, Horse Owner
 Charles Hawtrey as Lew Rimmel
 Alfie Bass as Newspaper seller
 Sid James as Bottomley
 Kenneth More as Rosedale Film Studio Director
 Stuart Latham as Rosedale Film Studio Assistant  
 Leslie Phillips as Reporter
 Michael Ward as Racegoer
 Edie Martin as Lady at Meeting  
 Sam Kydd as Newspaper Vendor
 Thora Hird as Tea Stall woman
 Ellen Pollock as Horsey Lady
 Duncan Lamont as Trainer
 Harold Goodwin (English actor) as Street Stall Owner (uncredited)
 Michael Ward (actor) as man with Binoculars at Racetrack (uncredited)
 Arthur Mullard as Rosedale Film Studio Employee (uncredited)
 'The Galloping Major' (the Horse, 'Bobbie') as himself

Release
The film premiered at the Plaza cinema in London on 5 May 1951.
It has also been released on DVD.

Location
 "Lambs Green" in the film is actually Belsize Village, (nb. Belsize Park and Belsize (ward)), London NW3. The cafe in the film was a greengrocer's shop in 2012, but the whole area is easily recognisable.
 The race track was filmed at Alexandra Palace, which can be seen briefly in the background.

References

Bibliography
 Harper, Sue & Porter, Vincent. British Cinema of the 1950s: The Decline of Deference. Oxford University Press, 2007.
 Murphy, Robert. Directors in British and Irish Cinema: A Reference Companion. British Film Institute, 2006.

External links

1951 films
British sports comedy films
Films directed by Henry Cornelius
1950s sports comedy films
Films shot in London
Films set in London
Films set in Liverpool
British horse racing films
Films shot at Riverside Studios
British black-and-white films
1950s English-language films
1950s British films